Hendrikus Wilhelmus Maria "Dick" Schoof is a Dutch civil servant. Currently in function of secretary-general at the Ministry of Justice and Security, per 1 March 2020.

Career 
Schoof was born in the Dutch village of Santpoort. He studied urban and regional planning at the Radboud University Nijmegen from 1975 to 1982 and worked at the Association of Netherlands Municipalities. In 1988 he became civil servant at the Ministry of Education, Culture and Sciences and in 1996 he was appointed as deputy secretary-general at the Ministry of Justice. 

After this, Schoof was appointed as head of a number of justice and security related services: he was chief director at the Immigration and Naturalisation Service (from 1999 at least until 2003), project-director-general for the development of the new immigration legislation, director-general for the police (at least from 2010 until 2013), National Coordinator for Security and Counterterrorism (head of the national counter terrorism unit) and director-general of the General Intelligence and Security Service. 

During his time at the Immigration and Naturalisation Service, Schoof played an important role in reforming the immigration legislation. As director-general for the police, he in charge during the restructuring of the police from a number of regional organizations into a single national police. As head of the counterterrorism unit, he was criticized for trying to influence the investigations around the shooting down of Malaysia Airlines Flight 17. 

In December 2019, Schoof was announced as the new secretary-general at the Ministry of Justice and Security, the highest non-political position in the Ministry. Schoof is appointed to replace Siebe Riedstra, who didn't manage to stem the flow of scandals at the Ministry.

References 

1957 births
Living people
Dutch police officers
Radboud University Nijmegen alumni
People from Velsen